Ninhue is a Chilean commune and town in the Itata Province, Ñuble Region.

Demographics
Of these, 1,433 (25%) lived in urban areas and 4,305 (75%) in rural areas. The population fell by 10.6% (679 persons) between the 1992 and 2002 censuses.

Administration
As a commune, Ninhue is a third-level administrative division of Chile administered by a municipal council, headed by an alcalde who is directly elected every four years. The 2008-2012 alcalde is Luis Molina Melo (PDC).

Within the electoral divisions of Chile, Ninhue is represented in the Chamber of Deputies by Jorge Sabag (PDC) and Frank Sauerbaum (RN) as part of the 42nd electoral district, together with San Fabián, Ñiquén, San Carlos, San Nicolás, Quirihue, Cobquecura, Treguaco, Portezuelo, Coelemu, Ránquil, Quillón, Bulnes, Cabrero and Yumbel. The commune is represented in the Senate by Alejandro Navarro Brain (MAS) and Hosain Sabag Castillo (PDC) as part of the 12th senatorial constituency (Biobío-Cordillera).

References

External links
  Comuna de Ninhue

Communes of Chile
Populated places in Itata Province